The 2008 FIA European Touring Car Cup was the fourth running of the FIA European Touring Car Cup. It was held on 19 October 2008 at the Salzburgring near Salzburg in Austria.

Teams and drivers

Results

Race 1

Final standings

References

External links
Official website of the FIA European Touring Car Cup

European Touring Car Cup
European Touring Car Cup
European Touring Car Cup
2008 in European sport